Tiawah is a census-designated place (CDP) in Rogers County, Oklahoma, United States. The population was 189 at the 2010 census, a 13.9 percent gain over the figure of 166 recorded in 2000. It was built on the St. Louis, Iron Mountain, & Southern Railway line running from Coffeyville, Kansas, to Fort Smith, Arkansas. The post office existed from August 24, 1903, until December 31, 1938. It is said to be named for Tiawah Mound in Georgia.

Geography
Tiawah is located at  (36.256876, -95.547602).

According to the United States Census Bureau, the CDP has a total area of 4.1 square miles (10.6 km2), all land.

Demographics

As of the census of 2000, there were 166 people, 57 households, and 49 families residing in the CDP. The population density was 40.5 people per square mile (15.6/km2). There were 58 housing units at an average density of 14.1/sq mi (5.5/km2). The racial makeup of the CDP was 80.12% White, 18.07% Native American, and 1.81% from two or more races.

There were 57 households, out of which 35.1% had children under the age of 18 living with them, 75.4% were married couples living together, 8.8% had a female householder with no husband present, and 14.0% were non-families. 10.5% of all households were made up of individuals, and 1.8% had someone living alone who was 65 years of age or older. The average household size was 2.91 and the average family size was 3.16.

In the CDP, the population was spread out, with 27.7% under the age of 18, 6.0% from 18 to 24, 27.7% from 25 to 44, 33.1% from 45 to 64, and 5.4% who were 65 years of age or older. The median age was 38 years. For every 100 females, there were 107.5 males. For every 100 females age 18 and over, there were 106.9 males.

The median income for a household in the CDP was $30,625, and the median income for a family was $31,094. Males had a median income of $29,167 versus $15,536 for females. The per capita income for the CDP was $14,673. About 22.0% of families and 20.5% of the population were below the poverty line, including 26.7% of those under the age of eighteen and none of those 65 or over.

References

Further reading
Shirk, George H.; Oklahoma Place Names; University of Oklahoma Press; Norman, Oklahoma; 1987: .

Census-designated places in Rogers County, Oklahoma
Census-designated places in Oklahoma